During the 1990–91 English football season, Sheffield United F.C. competed in the Football League First Division, after being promoted from the Second Division the previous season.

Season summary
Sheffield United had returned to the top flight after two successive promotions, and it soon appeared that perhaps First Division survival was a bridge too far, with the club going 16 matches without a win at the start of the season, leaving the club bottom of the division on Christmas Day with only 4 points. However, a run of seven straight victories at the turn of the year lifted United from 20th to 12th, and, although the winning streak eventually came to a halt, it was more than enough to ensure United's survival in 13th, twelve points clear of relegation.

Final league table

Results

First Division

FA Cup

League Cup

Full Members' Cup

Players

First-team squad
Squad at end of season

Left club during season

Transfers

Out
 Wilf Rostron - Brentford, January 1991

References

Notes

Sheffield United
Sheffield United F.C. seasons